Abraliopsis falco is a species of enoploteuthid cephalopod found in the tropical waters of the East Pacific Ocean, and is known from Chile, Colombia, Costa Rica, Ecuador, El Salvador, Guatemala, México, Nicaragua, Panamá, Perú and the United States. Females are larger than males, reaching sizes of 41–46 mm mantle length, with males reaching 35–37 mm mantle length.

References

Abraliopsis
Molluscs described in 1972